Joyce Piliso-Seroke (born 1933) is a South-African educator, activist, feminist and community organizer. A former vice president of the World YWCA, she traveled internationally to speak about the effects of apartheid, overcoming imprisonment and attempted censorship in her pursuit of justice and gender equality. She is a member of South Africa's national Order of the Baobab in Gold, and was appointed the first chair of the South African Commission for Gender Equality.

Early life and education 
Piliso-Seroke was born on 11 July 1933 in Crown Mines, Johannesburg, Transvaal (now Gauteng). Her father was a mine supervisor and her mother was a primary school teacher, and for several years Piliso-Seroke's mother was also her teacher at school. She encountered racism at a young age: when shopping with her family in Mayfair, white Afrikaner shopkeepers would address her mother as "girl". More than once, when Piliso-Seroke walked home with milk from the dairy, local white boys would set their dogs on her, laughing as she ran away.

She graduated from Kilnerton High School in Pretoria. Piliso-Seroke studied at the South African Native College at Fort Hare next, earning her University Education Diploma in 1956. At the predominantly male school of Fort Hare, she learned to speak up for herself during meetings of the African National Congress Youth League, where she and other women students had to verbally support each other to overcome attempts at intimidation by the male students.

Career and community work

During apartheid 
After graduation, Piliso-Seroke worked as a teacher at Wilberforce Institute at Evaton, but quit and decided to pursue social work instead. With financial help from the Institute of Race Relations, she traveled to Europe and completed a postgraduate course in Social Policy and Administration in Swansea, South Wales.

Returning to South Africa, Piliso-Seroke took a job with the Young Women's Christian Association (YWCA) at Natal (now KwaZulu-Natal). This work soon led Piliso-Seroke to develop her skills as a community organizer, teaching women to become active in political discussions. Although the YWCA offered a variety of programs for women, the organization was hindered by the 1891 Bantu Code, which kept many African women in the legal position of minors, controlled by male relatives. The YWCA staff began a petition in support of abolishing the law, but this was not successful. Afterwards, they developed the Women Empowerment Programme to teach women how to safeguard personal property through the creation of simple wills.

Soon, Piliso-Seroke was promoted to national secretary of YWCA, and she began travelling to international YWCA conferences to speak about her experiences with apartheid. In 1975, she became a member of the Executive Committee of the World YWCA in Geneva, Switzerland, and remained in that position until 1976. That year, the Soweto Uprising took place in South Africa. When Piliso-Seroke and the rest of the Executive Committee visited Soweto afterwards, they were detained by the Orlando Police Station for four days.

Piliso-Seroke was later detained again, held at the Old Fort Prison on Constitution Hill, Johannesburg. After being released, she became Vice President of the World YWCA, a position she held from 1983 to 1995. She worked with other YWCA regions, joining with other groups and networks to coordinate campaigns such as the Women Against Oppression Campaign.

When her passport was revoked by the South African Special Branch, Piliso-Seroke could no longer travel abroad to speak about apartheid. Her solution was to produce two documentaries with her friend Betty Wolpert, a South African filmmaker living in England, and these documentaries were subsequently shown abroad.

Post-apartheid 
Between 1992 and 1993, Piliso-Seroke served on the Transvaal Board of the National Co-ordinating Council for Returnees, assisting efforts to help South African exiles return home.

In 1996, Piliso-Seroke joined the human rights committee of the South African Truth and Reconciliation Commission (TRC), participating in public hearings that investigated human rights violations and supported victims. She was a trustee for the Eskom Development Foundation. Three years later she was appointed as the first chair of the Commission for Gender Equality, reappointed again in 2002. During her time with the Commission for Gender Equality, Piliso-Seroke found herself tested when the Commission's office was moved to a new location on Constitution Hill – where the women's prison had been situated. Every day, she had to walk past the building where she had once been imprisoned. She later spoke about the experience:Initially, I would always pass and be constantly reminded of what I went through there. I was stripped of my identity; they took everything from me and reduced me to a number... [but] after a while, I would walk through that gate, the same gate I was walked through by apartheid officials, and smile. I would say: ‘Hi lieutenant, what do you think of me now? I have got my independence, my liberation.’

Honours 
In 2008, Piliso-Seroke was conferred to South Africa's national Order of the Baobab in Gold, for her contributions to "freedom, development, reconstruction and the struggle for gender equality" in South Africa. In 2014, the Anglican Church of Southern Africa awarded Piliso-Seroke the Order of Simon of Cyrene for her distinguished service.

References 

South African activists
South African women activists
South African educators
South African feminists
YWCA leaders
Living people
1933 births
Order of the Baobab
University of Fort Hare alumni
People from Johannesburg
Anti-apartheid activists
Women civil rights activists